Kim Yu-song (born 24 January 1995) is a North Korean professional footballer who plays as a forward for April 25 in the DPR Korea League.

Club career
During the 2017 AFC Cup, Kim made headlines for scoring five goals in a 6–0 victory over Mongolian side Erchim FC.

International career
Kim made his senior international debut in a 5–2 away loss to Vietnam, replacing Kim Kuk-Bom after 73 minutes. He scored his first goal for his nation on 6 June 2017; the equaliser in a 2–2 draw with Qatar, before scoring another equaliser a week later, this time against Hong Kong.

Career statistics

International

International goals
Scores and results list North Korea's goal tally first.

U23 goals

Scores and results list North Korea's U-23 goal tally first.

References

External links
 
 Kim Yu-song at FIFA
Kim Yu-song at DPRKFootball

1995 births
Living people
North Korean footballers
North Korea international footballers
April 25 Sports Club players
Association football forwards
Footballers at the 2018 Asian Games
Asian Games competitors for North Korea